Justin David Hancock (born October 28, 1990) is an American baseball coach and former pitcher, who is the current pitching coach of the Indiana State Syacamores. He played in Major League Baseball (MLB) for the Chicago Cubs and in Nippon Professional Baseball (NPB) for the Hokkaido Nippon-Ham Fighters.

Career

Amateur career
Before playing professionally, Hancock attended Defiance High School in Defiance, Ohio. He then attended Lincoln Trail College, where he was named All-Great Rivers Athletic Conference in 2011.

San Diego Padres
The San Diego Padres selected Hancock in the ninth round of the 2011 Major League Baseball draft, and he signed for a bonus of $100,000. After going 0–3 with a 7.09 earned run average (ERA) to begin his career, Hancock posted a 3.30 ERA in 28 games (16 starts) between the Eugene Emeralds and Fort Wayne TinCaps in 2012.

In 2013, he was 8–8 with a 3.38 mark in 26 starts between Fort Wayne and the Lake Elsinore Storm. While with Fort Wayne, he went 5–1 with a 1.73.

In 2014, he went 3–2 with a 3.92 ERA in 15 games (14 starts) for the AZL Padres and San Antonio Missions. He was sent to pitch in the Arizona Fall League following the 2014 campaign.

Chicago Cubs
In 2017, the Padres traded Hancock to the Chicago Cubs for Matt Szczur.

The Cubs promoted him to the major leagues and he made his debut on May 9, 2018. He was non-tendered and became a free agent on November 30, 2018.

Hokkaido Nippon-Ham Fighters
On December 5, 2018, Hancock signed a one-year contract with the Hokkaido Nippon-Ham Fighters of Nippon Professional Baseball (NPB) for an estimated ¥70 million.

On October 11, 2019, Fighters announced that team had not signed with Hancock for next season. On October 18, 2019, he become free agent.

Coaching career
In July 2021, Hancock joined the Indiana State baseball program as an assistant coach; in his role, he will work primarily with Sycamore pitchers.

Personal life
Hancock is married to Tessa, a former college women's basketball player.

References

External links

1990 births
Living people
American expatriate baseball players in Japan
Arizona League Padres players
Baseball players from Ohio
Chicago Cubs players
El Paso Chihuahuas players
Eugene Emeralds players
Fort Wayne TinCaps players
Hokkaido Nippon-Ham Fighters players
Indiana State Sycamores baseball coaches
Iowa Cubs players
Lake Elsinore Storm players
Major League Baseball pitchers
Nippon Professional Baseball pitchers
People from Defiance, Ohio
San Antonio Missions players
Surprise Saguaros players
Tennessee Smokies players
Lincoln Trail Statesmen baseball players